The Communist Party of the Balearic Islands is the federation of the Communist Party of Spain (PCE) in the Balearic Islands. PCIB was constituted in its present shape in 1977.

References

1977 establishments in Spain
Balearic Islands
Political parties established in 1977
Political parties in the Balearic Islands